Mostafa Ahmadi Roshan (8 September 1979 in Hamadan – 11 January 2012 in Tehran) was an Iranian nuclear scientist who was assassinated in 2012. He was also deputy of commerce at the Natanz nuclear power plant.

Life
Ahmadi Roshan (also known as "Shahid Ahmadi-Roshan" after the assassination, denoting his status as a martyr) was born on 8 September 1979 in the village of Sangestan in Hamedan province, and grew up in a poor family. He was among the students of Aziz Khoshvaght (who was known as an Islamic moralist), studied polymer engineering at the Sharif University of Technology, and had published several ISI articles in English and Persian by the time he was 32 years old.

Family

Ahmadi Roshan was married to Fatemeh Boluri-Kashani, who graduated with a master's degree in chemistry from Sharif University. His father was Rahim Ahmadi-Roshan and his mother was Sedigheh Salari. His only child, Ali-Reza, was four years old when Ahmadi Roshan was killed.

Assassination
The last of several assassinated Iranian nuclear scientists (following Masoud Alimohammadi, Majid Shahriari, and Darioush Rezaeinejad), Ahmadi Roshan was killed on 11 January 2012 by a motorbike bomb at 8:30am in the vicinity of Seyyed Khandan in Tehran.

Natanz Enrichment Site
In response to this and previous assassinations, a number of students from universities throughout the country sent letters to Iranian authorities, asking them to change the names of Iranian nuclear facilities and enrichment sites to those of the murdered scientists. Five of these requests were honored, and the Natanz enrichment site's name was changed to "The Site of Shahid Mostafa Ahmadi-Roshan".

See also

 Assassination of Iranian nuclear scientists
 Assassination of Masoud Alimohammadi
 Nuclear facilities in Iran
 Assassination and terrorism in Iran

References

External links
 Leader’s Message on Martyrdom of Mostafa Ahmadi-Roshan
 Nuclear scientist killed in Tehran motorbike bomb attack
 Iran's Supreme Leader's Speech in Meeting with Family of Shahid Mostafa Ahmadi-Roshan

Iranian terrorism victims
Nuclear program of Iran
People murdered in Iran
1979 births
2012 deaths
Deaths by car bomb in Iran
Iranian murder victims
21st-century Iranian engineers
Iran–Israel proxy conflict